is the railway station in Hontabaru-men, Saza, Nagasaki Prefecture. It is operated by Matsuura Railway and is on the Nishi-Kyūshū Line.

Lines 
Matsuura Railway
Nishi-Kyūshū Line

Adjacent stations 

|-
|colspan=5 style="text-align:center;" |Matsuura Railway

Station layout
The station is ground level with two platforms and three tracks.

Environs
This station stands near the central area of Saza Town.
National Route 204
Saza Bus Center
Saza Town Office
JP Saza Post Office
Shinwa Bank Saza Branch

History
On 27 December 1931, the station opened as Sasa Station for business as the Sasebo Railway built a branch from Yotsuyubi (later renamed Yotsuibi) on the existing line connecting the city of Sasebo and Usunoura.

On 24 October 1933, a new line was opened from Sasa to Sechibaru. This opening was actually a transfer of an existing private mining railway to the railway company.

On 1 October 1936, the Sasebo Railway was nationalized. Simultaneously, the station name was changed from Sasa to Saza, without changing the kanji script.

On 1 March 1945, the railway route was changed so that Saza became a junction of the Matsuura Line and the Usunoura Line. The operation of the Usunoura Line (Saza–Usunoura) was discontinued on 26 December 1971.

On 1 April 1987, the Japanese National Railways was privatized and this station was inherited by JR Kyushu.
On 1 April 1988, this station was inherited by Matsuura Railway.

References

External links
Matsuura Railway (Japanese)

Railway stations in Japan opened in 1931
Railway stations in Nagasaki Prefecture